Christopher Maude Chavasse,  (9 November 1884 – 10 March 1962) was a British athlete, soldier and religious leader from the Chavasse family. He competed at the 1908 Summer Olympics in London, served in the First World War and was later the Bishop of Rochester.

Early life
Chavasse was the son of Francis Chavasse, a Bishop of Liverpool and founder of St Peter's College, Oxford and his wife Edith Maude. His twin brother, Noel Godfrey Chavasse, won the Victoria Cross and bar. Christopher was the elder of the two by 20 minutes. The twins had two other brothers and three sisters.

Christopher and Noel Chavasse both attended Magdalen College School in Oxford (1896–1900) followed by Liverpool College (1900–1904) before progressing to Trinity College, Oxford, competing in rugby, lacrosse and athletics. They competed on the British team at the 1908 Summer Olympics in London: Christopher came second in his preliminary heat of the 400 metres shortly after Noel came third in his heat of the same event. Neither advanced to the semi-finals.
He was also an England lacrosse international.

Clergy
Christopher was ordained a priest on Trinity Sunday 1911 (22 May), by his father the Bishop of Liverpool, at Liverpool Cathedral.

After being ordained, he was appointed to the St Helens Parish Church staff. The former Liverpool RU player played mostly in the `A` Team as an amateur, and made his debut for the St Helens RLFC first team in the 24 points to 2 home victory over Hunslet on the 2 Jan 1910.

Military service
During World War I, Chavasse served as a chaplain in the Royal Army Chaplains' Department of the British Army. On 15 August 1916, he was promoted from chaplain to the Forces 4th Class (equivalent to captain) to chaplain to the Forces 3rd Class (equivalent to major). On 30 September 1918, he was promoted to chaplain to the Forces 2nd Class (equivalent to lieutenant colonel).

Career
After the First World War, Chavasse rose through the ranks of the Church of England. He served as rector of St Aldate's, Oxford, from 1922 to 1928 and as rector of St Peter-le-Bailey, Oxford from 1927 to 1940.
He became the first master of St Peter's Hall, Oxford upon its founding in 1929, continuing the work of his father, who had died in 1928. He was succeeded in 1940 by Julian Thornton-Duesbery.

He was nominated Bishop of Rochester on 19 March 1940, consecrated on 25 April the same year and served in that position until his resignation on 30 September 1960.

In 1948, a sermon given by Chavasse about Belshazzar's Feast was featured as a religious short film produced by J. Arthur Rank.

In 1943 Chavasse was chairman of the Archbishops' Commission on Evangelism which published the controversial report Towards the Conversion of England. In accordance with his hope for mass evangelisation, in 1955 Chavasse supported the Crusade of Billy Graham at Harringay Arena.

Chavasse gave his views on homosexuality informally to the Wolfenden Committee, disagreeing with the eventual proposal of the committee to allow same-sex relationships to be legal in private, and arguing that "homosexual practice is alarmingly catching".

In 1951 Chavasse founded Bennett Memorial Diocesan School in Tunbridge Wells with the school's main benefactress Lady Elena Bennett. The school was founded on 17 October 1951 and opened to students on 8 January 1953, to 400 students and only 18 teachers. Bennett Memorial is a Church of England school based within the Diocese of Rochester, having been founded while Chavasse served as the Bishop of Rochester. He founded Rochester Theological College in 1959, which was intended for mature students.

Chavasse also served briefly as an original trustee of St Peter's College upon its incorporation in 1961.

Personal life
Chavasse married Beatrice Willink shortly after the First World War, in July 1919. They had three sons: Noel, their eldest son named in honour of his uncle Noel Godfrey Chavasse, who served as an aide to Bernard Montgomery during the war, Michael and John, and two daughters, Anna and Susan.

In 1939, he lost a leg in a boating accident and was fitted with an artificial leg.

Honours and decorations

Chavasse was awarded the Military Cross (MC) during World War I. His citation, published in the London Gazette dating 25 August 1917, read:

He was also awarded the Croix de Guerre (1914–1918) by the Republic of France "for distinguished services rendered during the course of the campaign". Chavasse's other World War I medals were the 1914 Star with clasp, the British War Medal, and the Victory Medal.

In the 1936 King's Birthday Honours, he was appointed Officer of the Order of the British Empire (OBE) in its Military Division. In 1937, he was awarded the King George VI Coronation Medal.

On 31 January 1941, he was awarded the Efficiency Decoration (TD) for long service in the Territorial Army. In June 1946, he was appointed chaplain of the Venerable Order of Saint John (CStJ). On 18 March 1959, he was commissioned as a deputy lieutenant (DL) by the Lord Lieutenant of Kent.

Notes

References

1884 births
1962 deaths
Military personnel from Oxfordshire
20th-century Church of England bishops
Alumni of Trinity College, Oxford
Athletes (track and field) at the 1908 Summer Olympics
Bishops of Rochester
British Army personnel of World War I
British identical twins
British lacrosse players
British male sprinters
Chavasse family (United Kingdom)
Deputy Lieutenants of Kent
English male sprinters
English military chaplains
English rugby league players
Holders of a Lambeth degree
Masters of St Peter's College, Oxford
Officers of the Order of the British Empire
Olympic athletes of Great Britain
People educated at Liverpool College
People from Oxfordshire
Recipients of the Croix de Guerre 1914–1918 (France)
Recipients of the Military Cross
Royal Army Chaplains' Department officers
St Helens R.F.C. players
World War I chaplains